Aleksei Kapoura is a paralympic swimmer from Russia competing mainly in category S9 events.

Career 
Aleksei competed in the 1992 Summer Paralympics for the Unified team, there he won silver medals in both the 100m butterfly and 200m medley, having set games records in the heats of both events.  He also competed in the 50m freestyle finishing fifth, the 100m freestyle finishing fourth and was part of the 4 × 100 m freestyle team that finished seventh and 4 × 100 m medley team that finished sixth.  At the 1996 Summer Paralympics Aleksei competed for Russia where he again won the silver medal in the 100m butterfly and finished sixth in the 50m freestyle, eighth in the 100m freestyle and failed to make the final of the 100m backstroke.  In 2000 Aleksei failed to match his earlier performances only finishing eighth in the 100m butterfly, he failed to make the final of the 50m freestyle, 100m freestyle or 200m medley and was part of the Russian team that finished eighth in the 4 × 100 m medley.

References

External links
 

Paralympic swimmers of the Unified Team
Paralympic swimmers of Russia
Swimmers at the 1992 Summer Paralympics
Swimmers at the 1996 Summer Paralympics
Swimmers at the 2000 Summer Paralympics
Paralympic silver medalists for the Unified Team
Russian male medley swimmers
Living people
Medalists at the 1992 Summer Paralympics
Medalists at the 1996 Summer Paralympics
Year of birth missing (living people)
Paralympic medalists in swimming
Russian male butterfly swimmers
Russian male freestyle swimmers
S9-classified Paralympic swimmers
20th-century Russian people